Juan Caride (born 13 December 1965) is a Spanish wrestler. He competed in the men's freestyle 68 kg at the 1988 Summer Olympics.

References

1965 births
Living people
Spanish male sport wrestlers
Olympic wrestlers of Spain
Wrestlers at the 1988 Summer Olympics
Place of birth missing (living people)
20th-century Spanish people